Nilayananda Dutta (1952/3 – 19 September 2021) was a senior lawyer, cricket administrator, and Indian cricket umpire. He stood in one ODI game in 1990. He was a senior advocate in the Supreme Court of India and an official of the Assam Cricket Association. He was a member of the three member Mudgal Committee (headed by Justice Mukul Mudgal and comprising former Additional Solicitor General of India L Nageswara Rao as the other member) formed to probe the 2013 Indian Premier League spot-fixing and betting case.

See also
 List of One Day International cricket umpires

References

1950s births
Year of birth uncertain
2021 deaths
Indian One Day International cricket umpires
Place of birth missing